The 2019–20 Green Bay Phoenix men's basketball team represented the University of Wisconsin–Green Bay in the 2019–20 NCAA Division I men's basketball season. The Phoenix, led by fifth-year head coach Linc Darner, played their home games at the Resch Center in Ashwaubenon, Wisconsin and the Kress Events Center in Green Bay, Wisconsin as members of the Horizon League. They finished the season 17–16, 11–7 in Horizon League play to finish in third place. They defeated Oakland in the quarterfinals of the Horizon League tournament before losing in the semifinals to Northern Kentucky.

On May 17, 2020, head coach Linc Darner was fired. He finished at Green Bay with a five-year record of 92–80.

Previous season
The Phoenix finished the 2018–19 season 21–17 overall, 10–8 in Horizon League play to finish in a tie for fourth place. In the Horizon League tournament, they defeated UIC in the quarterfinals, before falling to top seeded Wright State in the semifinals. They received an invitation to the CIT, where they defeated East Tennessee State in the first round, FIU in the second round, Cal State Bakersfield in the quarterfinals, Texas Southern in the semifinals, before falling to Marshall in the championship game.

Roster

Schedule and results

|-
!colspan=12 style=| Exhibition

|-
!colspan=12 style=| Non-conference regular season

|-
!colspan=9 style=| Horizon League regular season

|-
!colspan=12 style=| Horizon League tournament
|-

|-

Source

References

Green Bay Phoenix men's basketball seasons
Green Bay Phoenix
Green Bay Phoenix men's basketball
Green Bay Phoenix men's basketball